Ayatollah Hajj Sheykh Hasan Ali Nejabat Shirazi (1917-1989) was an Iranian mystic, author of several published theological works, and political activist.

Early life and education
He was born in 1917 at Shiraz, Iran. He passed preliminary and advanced courses in Shiraz and Najaf under supervision of masters.

He was trained under supervision of grand Masters, including Ayatollah Sayyid Mirza Ali Tabatabaei, Sheykh Muhammad Javad Ansari, Sheykh Muhammad Ali Boroujerd, Sayyed Abul Hasan Esfahani,  Sayyed Abdul hadi Shirazi, and Sayyed Abul Qasem Khoei.

Political and scientific activity
He established the religious school by the name of his son, "Shahid Mohammad Hossein Nejabat". He also had a political activist role during the Islamic revolution of Iran along with Ayatollah Sayyed Hosein Dastgheib against the Pahlavi Regime.

Selected works
His published and unpublished works include:
 Basair or The Holy Quran And Ahle Bayt
 The word of purity (Kalemah Al Tayyebah)
 Divine unity
 The word of love
 Explanation of Rajab Dua
 Explanation of shaban month pilgrimage
 Absolute governing of Jursit (Velayate Motlaqeh Faqih)

Death
He died in 1989, on the night of martyrdom of Imam Ali Al-Naghi in Shiraz..

See also 

 List of Ayatollahs

References

External links
 https://web.archive.org/web/20101101041600/http://kakaie.com/1

Iranian ayatollahs
People from Shiraz
Iranian writers
1917 births
1989 deaths
Iranian Muslim mystics